Studiotorino  is an Italian automotive design house, or The carrozzeria, specializing in completely handmade sports car. The company was founded on 1 January 2005 in Rivoli by Alfredo and Maria Paola Stola with Marco Goffi.

The carrozzeria continues the tradition of Alfredo Stola's grandfather, who founded the Stola company, a corrozzeria and model works, noted by Vincenzo Lancia, the founder of Lancia for the high quality of their design modelling work.

Models

 RUF Studiotorino RK Spyder, sportscar in limited edition
 RUF Studiotorino RK Coupè, sportscar in limited edition
 RUF Studiotorino R Spyder, sportscar in limited edition
 Cinqueporte scale model 1:4 on Maserati Quattroporte base, presented in Rome on 5 February 2008 at “Scrigno tesori d’Italia”
 500 Diabolika, Fiat Nuova 500 personalisation, in limited edition presented on 12 September 2008 in Turin
 Coupetorino, scale model 1:4 on Mercedes-Benz SL-Class base, presented on 12 December 2008 at "Torino capitale mondiale del Design 2008"
 KSU Gazal-1, collaboration for "design" with King Saud University and Magna Steyr Italy, whose model was presented at the 2010 Geneva Motor Show.
CoupèTorino MY 2013, new stile concept developed with a collaboration of 6 student of IAAD of Torino, the model in scale 1/4 was presented on 27 May 2013 at the Design Center of Mercedes Benz in Como
Moncenisio, sports car in limited edition, evolution of RK Coupe based on new Porsche Cayman S (type 981)

Awards
RK Spyder winner of the concours  “L’auto più bella del mondo”, 3 March 2006 at the Palazzo della Triennale in Milan – category sportscars
RK Coupè winner of the concours  “L’auto più bella del mondo”, 11 April 2007 at the “Salone dell’automobile” in Shanghai – category sportscars

See also 

List of Italian companies

References

External links 
 

Car manufacturers of Italy
Companies established in 2005
2005 establishments in Italy
Italian brands
Coachbuilders of Italy
Rivoli, Piedmont